Megapharanaspis nedini is a small (maximally ) trilobite of the superfamily Emuelloidea, within which it occupies a family on its own. Its fossils have been found in the Lower Cambrian of South-Australia.

Etymology 
The genus name composed of the Greek μέγας (mega), meaning great, pharangos, meaning gully, and ἀσπίς (aspis) shield, referencing Big Gully on Kangaroo Island, the only known site where fossils of Megapharanaspis were collected. The species epithet nedini is in honor of Dr. Chris Nedin.

References 

Cambrian trilobites of Australia
Emuelloidea
Redlichiida genera

Cambrian genus extinctions